Center Township is a township in Winnebago County, Iowa, in the USA.

History
Center Township was established in 1864. The city of Lake Mills has grown in the Northeast quadrant of the township.

References

Townships in Winnebago County, Iowa
Townships in Iowa
1864 establishments in Iowa
Populated places established in 1864